Al-Ashraf or al-Ashraf Musa (died 27 August 1237), fully Al-Ashraf Musa Abu'l-Fath al-Muzaffar ad-Din, was a Kurdish ruler of the Ayyubid dynasty.

The son of Sultan al-Adil I, al-Ashraf was installed by his father in Harran in 1201 as Governor of the Jezireh. After his brother al-Mu'azzam's death in 1227, al-Ashraf received a request from his nephew, al-Muazzam's son, An-Nasir Dawud, for aid in opposing his brother al-Kamil of Egypt. Instead, al-Ashraf and al-Kamil came to an agreement to divide their nephew's lands between them.  Al-Ashraf captured Damascus in June 1229 and took control of the city, serving as emir of Damascus until his death in 1237.  He took Baalbek as well in 1230. In return, he ceded his lands in Mesopotamia to al-Kamil and acknowledged his supremacy, while an-Nasir had to be satisfied with the possession of a principality centered on Kerak in the Transjordan region. A number of years later, al-Ashraf began to chafe under his brother's authority, and in 1237 allied himself with Kayqubad I, the Seljuk Sultan of Rûm, and various Ayyubid princelings based in Syria, against al-Kamil. However, Kayqubad died early in the summer of that year, and al-Ashraf himself died on 27 August, breaking up the alliance.  Al-Ashraf was succeeded in Damascus by his younger brother, as-Salih Ismail.

See also
 Aqsab Mosque

References

1237 deaths
Muslims of the Fifth Crusade
13th-century Kurdish people
13th-century Ayyubid rulers
Ayyubid emirs of Damascus
Year of birth unknown